Moazzam Jahi Market is a fruit market in Hyderabad, Telangana, India. Named after Moazzam Jah- the second son of Mir Osman Ali Khan

History

It was constructed in 1935 during the reign of the last Nizam, Mir Osman Ali Khan. It was named after his second son Moazzam Jah. The building is made of granite and has white domes, constructed in a style similar to that of the High Court.

Market Shops
Jambagh flower market was a part of this market. The fruit market has been shifted to Kothapet Fruit Market in 1980s.

This market also houses the Famous Ice Cream Shop, along with Gafoor and Bilal, which are known for their hand-made ice creams. The market also has famous bakery shop namely Karachi Bakers.

Transport
Gandhi Bhavan metro station of Hyderabad Metro is nearby.
Buses run by TSRTC provide connectivity from and to this place

See also
Prince Moazzam Jah

References

Neighbourhoods in Hyderabad, India
Retail markets in Hyderabad, India